

Social and political sciences